David Leopold Wiman (6 August 1884 – 6 October 1950) was a Swedish gymnast who competed in the 1912 Summer Olympics. He was part of the Swedish team that won the gold medal in the Swedish system event. In retirement he ran his own insurance company.

References

1884 births
1950 deaths
Swedish male artistic gymnasts
Gymnasts at the 1912 Summer Olympics
Olympic gymnasts of Sweden
Olympic gold medalists for Sweden
Olympic medalists in gymnastics
Medalists at the 1912 Summer Olympics
Sportspeople from Gothenburg